Rochelle Stevens (born September 8, 1966 in Memphis, Tennessee) is a former 1996 Olympic gold medalist for the United States in the women's 4x400-meter relay. She was also part of the team that won the silver medal in the same event and 6th in the world at 400 meters at the 1992 Summer Olympics in Barcelona, Spain. Track and Field Head Coach at LeMoyne-Owen College since 2021.

Biography 
At college-level, she was an NCAA Division I 400 m champion and won NCAA All-American honours eleven times. She won at the USA Outdoor Track and Field Championships on four occasions and was the 400 m champion at the 1992 US Olympic Trials. Over the course of her career she placed in the season's top-ten 400 m runners a total of six times.

Since 1999, Stevens helped thousands of clients lose weight and get healthy with her weight loss and cardio DVD at Rochelle's Health and Wellness Spa. The Memphis City Council renamed a street in front of Stevens alma mater Melrose High School (Memphis, Tennessee) to Olympian Rochelle Stevens Avenue.

In 2021 LeMoyne-Owen College has hired Stevens as Track and Field Head Coach and Director of Operations.

References

American female sprinters
1966 births
Living people
Morgan State Bears women's track and field athletes
Athletes (track and field) at the 1992 Summer Olympics
Athletes (track and field) at the 1996 Summer Olympics
Olympic gold medalists for the United States in track and field
Olympic silver medalists for the United States in track and field
Sportspeople from Memphis, Tennessee
Track and field athletes from Tennessee
World Athletics Championships medalists
Athletes (track and field) at the 1987 Pan American Games
Pan American Games gold medalists for the United States
Medalists at the 1996 Summer Olympics
Medalists at the 1992 Summer Olympics
Pan American Games medalists in athletics (track and field)
Goodwill Games medalists in athletics
World Athletics Championships winners
Competitors at the 1998 Goodwill Games
Competitors at the 1990 Goodwill Games
Medalists at the 1987 Pan American Games
Olympic female sprinters
Universiade medalists in athletics (track and field)
Universiade gold medalists for the United States